Olaf Blackwood (born 5 November 1980) is a Jamaican singer-songwriter and record producer.

Early life
Blackwood was born in Lacovia, a village in Jamaica's Saint Elizabeth Parish, where he helped support his family's farm throughout his childhood. As a child, his two passions were soccer and music. Inspired by his uncle Errol Blackwood, the lead singer of reggae band Messenjah, Blackwood dropped out of school at sixteen and traveled to Kingston to pursue a music career.

Music career
Blackwood recorded his first single for Garnett Silk's record label in 1995. He then released music for Mario C Productions on the Artillery rhythm. After struggling to find success in Jamaica, Blackwood migrated to the United States in 2002. In the United States, he has written and produced songs for entertainers such as Shaggy and Tessanne Chin.

Blackwood achieved commercial success in 2017 with the single "I Need You", an Armin van Buuren and Fernando Garibay song for which Blackwood served as a featured vocalist. "I Need You" was certified platinum by the RIAA and peaked at #7 on Billboard's Digital Song Sales chart.

Blackwood also mentors aspiring songwriters through his publishing company, Holland Bamboo Publishing.

Feature discography

References

External links
Official Facebook Page

1980 births
Living people
Jamaican record producers
Record producers from Los Angeles
Musicians from Los Angeles
Dancehall musicians
Jamaican emigrants to the United States
Jamaican rappers
21st-century Jamaican male singers
Jamaican reggae singers
Musicians from Kingston, Jamaica
Reggae fusion artists